International Reviews of Immunology is an international peer-reviewed medical journal that covers basic and translational research in immunology and related fields.

Editor 
The editor in chief of International Reviews of Immunology is Dr. Himanshu Kumar (Indian Institute of Science Education and Research, Bhopal, India; WPI Immunology Frontier Research Center, Osaka University, Osaka, Japan).

References 

Immunology journals
8 times per year journals